is a Japanese badminton player. A former World's number 1 in the BWF rankings for the women's singles, she is well known for her speed, agility and endurance. She won a bronze at the 2016 Summer Olympics, and gold medal at the 2017 World Championships.

Career 
Okuhara started playing badminton since 2002. Eight years later, precisely in 2010 she joined the Japanese national team. The 2010 Osaka International Challenge became her international debut.

2010–2012 
In 2010, Okuhara reached the final of Lao International which she lost to Nitchaon Jindapol. The 16-year-old Okuhara became the youngest women's singles champion ever at the Japanese National Championships in 2011. Additionally, she won the Austrian title by defeating her teammate Mayu Sekiya and a bronze medal at World Junior Championships. 

Okuhara was a runner-up at the Asian Junior Championships, and helped her team in winning the mixed team title. She later clinched the gold medal at the World Junior Championships, having won bronze one year earlier at the 2011 BWF World Junior Championships. In July, she won her first Grand Prix title at the Canada Open.

2013–2014 
In 2013, while competing in her quarterfinal match against Saina Nehwal at Malaysia Open, she suffered a severe knee injury in the 3rd game and remained out of International circuit for almost an year. On her way to comeback in elite level of competition, she participated in first tournament in November since her last in January 2013 at the China Premier event.

In 2014, she won New Zealand Open beating Kana Ito in final. She also won Vietnam Open and Korean Grand Prix titles. She reached her first Superseries' final at the Hong Kong Open in year end. On her way to the final, she defeated Reigning World Champion Carolina Marín in semifinal in 2 very one-sided games. However, she finished second best to Tai Tzu-ying in the final contest.

2015 
Okuhara won two Grand Prix Gold titles at Malaysia and United States. In both occasions, she got the better of her compatriots Sayaka Takahashi and Sayaka Sato respectively. She also won China International Challenge event. At the Malaysian Superseries event, she played the longest ever Women's singles match against Wang Shixian in quarterfinal which lasted for whopping 111 minutes. Okuhara lost that match and was cramping heavily at the end. Scorecard was 21–19, 15–21, 20–22 in favour of Shixian. She won her first Superseries title at Japan Open in the final defeating her colleague Akane Yamaguchi with score of 21–18, 21–12. At the World Championships in Jakarta seeded 9th, she failed to get past Thai Porntip Buranaprasertsuk in 1st round having lost to her twice before. Just like previous season, Okuhara again reached the final of Hong Kong Open. She lost a very difficult encounter to Carolina Marín there, a contest of 3 games with very tight scoreline. At the end of the 2015 BWF season, she won the Dubai World Superseries final. On her path through without dropping a single game, she defeated all of her opponents namely Saina Nehwal, Tai Tzu-ying and top seed Carolina Marín. She defeated Marín twice, first in the preliminary round and again in semifinals with very one-sided scores. In the final she beat Wang Yihan 22–20, 21–18.

2016–2017 
In 2016, she won the prestigious All England Open on her Birthday after defeating Wang Shixian in the final with score 21–11, 16–21, 21–19, and thereby became the first Japanese women's singles player to lift this title in 39 years since Hiroe Yuki's triumph back in 1977. She was seeded 6th for Rio Olympic Games. She defeated Akane Yamaguchi in quarterfinal 11–21, 21–17, 21–10 and reached the semis. Her opponent for semifinal was No. 9 seed P. V. Sindhu. Okuhara had no answers to Indian's attacking play and she went down in 2-straight games 19–21, 10–21. In the bronze medal match she was given walkover against Li Xuerui of China as her opponent was injured. In the process, she became Japan's first ever Badminton Women's singles player to win an Olympic medal. In the China Superseries in November, she developed shoulder issues which forced her to withdraw from Hong Kong Open and her chance of defending the Dubai Superseries Finals title was thwarted.

In 2017, Okuhara claimed her first ever Australian Open title with a win over Akane Yamaguchi. Continuing her good form, she participated at the World Championships seeded 7th. After defeating Canada's Rachel Honderich and teammate Aya Ohori, she had an uphill task against Carolina Marín of Spain in the quarterfinals. She beat Marín, the two-time reigning Champion in a gruelling battle of an hour and 33 minutes. She also claimed hard-fought victory over Saina Nehwal in the semifinals, having lost the opening game. For the final, she faced opposition from P. V. Sindhu. She managed to edge a 21–19, 20–22, 22–20 victory over the Indian in one of the classics of Badminton history. Match stretched for 1:50 hours, making it the 2nd longest match in Women's singles badminton ever. Ironically enough, the longest one was also played by Okuhara; in 2015 against Shixian at the Malaysian Superseries, which she lost. With Okuhara's victory, she became the first ever Japanese to win the World title since 1977. After her triumph at the World stage, she also reached the final of Korean Open Premier Superseries, in which P. V. Sindhu managed to beat Okuhara. However afterwards she suffered knee injury and her performance dipped. She opted not to participate at the Dubai Superseries Finals, so as not to aggravate her knee problems.

2018 
In May, Okuhara helped Japan to win the Uber Cup again after 37 years. Japan beat Thailand by 3–0 in the final and Okuhara didn't lose any of her matches. She went to World Championships in Nanjing as defending champion but lost to the player she beat in the 2017 final, P. V. Sindhu, in 2 straight games in the quarterfinals. She won her first ever World Tour Title, the Thailand Open Super 500 by defeating P. V. Sindhu 21–15 and 18. In addition, she reached five more finals and won 2 of them in Korea and Hong Kong, both Super 500 events. Her final finishes were in Japan Super 750 (lost to Carolina Marín) Fuzhou Super 750 events (lost to Chen Yufei) and World Tour Finals in Guangzhou to P. V. Sindhu.

2019–20 
Okuhara reached the final of Singapore Open, but lost it to Tai Tzu-ying. Also, she reached the final of Australia Open & Japan Open but lost to Chen Yufei and Akane Yamaguchi respectively. In the World Championships, she was seeded 3rd. She defeated He Bingjiao and Ratchanok Intanon; reached the final of this tournament once more and set her encounter with P. V. Sindhu. In a repeat clash of 2017 World Championships final, she was defeated 7–21, 7–21 by the Indian player, henceforth settled for the silver medal. She succeeded in occupying the Ranking 1 of the world shifting Tai Tzu-ying on 29 October 2019. She also contested the Denmark Open final, which she lost to Tai Tzu-ying with 17–21, 14–21 scores. She was the runner-up in 6th straight tournament, after her defeat in the hands of Chen Yufei in Fuzhou China Open with the scores 21–9, 12–21, 18–21. She took part in World Tour Finals in Guangzhou where she had best of starts; defeating all her opponents of group stage. But in semi finals, she was beaten by Tai Tzu-ying whom she has beaten in group stage earlier. Okuhara won 2020 Denmark Open tournament after surpassing 3rd seed Carolina Marín in 2 games with scores 21–19, 21–17. This was the first time in 2 years that she won a World Tour title since her last at Hong Kong Open in 2018.

2021 
She won her second England Open title after her last in 2016 by beating Pornpawee Chochuwong from Thailand. She defeated her opponent in two games 21–12, 21–16.

Achievements

Olympic Games 
Women's singles

BWF World Championships 
Women's singles

BWF World Junior Championships 
Girls' singles

Asian Junior Championships 
Girls' singles

BWF World Tour (5 titles, 8 runners-up) 
The BWF World Tour, which was announced on 19 March 2017 and implemented in 2018, is a series of elite badminton tournaments sanctioned by the Badminton World Federation (BWF). The BWF World Tours are divided into levels of World Tour Finals, Super 1000, Super 750, Super 500, Super 300 (part of the HSBC World Tour), and the BWF Tour Super 100.

Women's singles

BWF Superseries (4 titles, 3 runners-up) 
The BWF Superseries, which was launched on 14 December 2006 and implemented in 2007, was a series of elite badminton tournaments, sanctioned by the Badminton World Federation (BWF). BWF Superseries levels were Superseries and Superseries Premier. A season of Superseries consisted of twelve tournaments around the world that had been introduced since 2011. Successful players were invited to the Superseries Finals, which were held at the end of each year.

Women's singles

  BWF Superseries Finals tournament
  BWF Superseries Premier tournament
  BWF Superseries tournament

BWF Grand Prix (6 titles) 
The BWF Grand Prix had two levels, the BWF Grand Prix and Grand Prix Gold. It was a series of badminton tournaments sanctioned by the Badminton World Federation (BWF) which was held from 2007 to 2017.

Women's singles

  BWF Grand Prix Gold tournament
  BWF Grand Prix tournament

BWF International Challenge/Series (2 titles, 1 runner-up) 
Women's singles

  BWF International Challenge tournament

Performance timeline

Career overview

National team

Junior level

Senior level

Individual competitions

Junior level 
Girls' singles

Girls' doubles

Senior level

Women's singles

Mixed doubles

Record against selected opponents 
Record against Year-end Finals finalists, World Championships semi-finalists, and Olympic quarter-finalists. Accurate as of 6 November 2022.

References

External links 
 
 Nozomi Okuhara's official website
 奥原希望オフィシャルブログ - Nozomi Okuhara's blog
 
 
 
 

1995 births
Living people
Sportspeople from Nagano Prefecture
Japanese female badminton players
Badminton players at the 2016 Summer Olympics
Badminton players at the 2020 Summer Olympics
Olympic badminton players of Japan
Olympic bronze medalists for Japan
Olympic medalists in badminton
Medalists at the 2016 Summer Olympics
Badminton players at the 2018 Asian Games
Asian Games gold medalists for Japan
Asian Games medalists in badminton
Medalists at the 2018 Asian Games
World No. 1 badminton players
21st-century Japanese women